The Eulogio "Amang" Rodriguez Institute of Science and Technology (commonly referred to as EARIST; Filipino: Kolehiyong Eulogio "Amang" Rodriguez sa Agham at Teknolohiya) is a public college in Santa Mesa, Manila in the Philippines. It was named after Eulogio Rodriguez, one of the longest serving senators in the country.

Founded in 1945 as a vocational-technical high school, it has evolved into a full-fledged higher education institution offering undergraduate and postgraduate degree programs by virtue of the Republic Act 6595.

EARIST has a Level II Status for its 14 degree programs awarded by the Accrediting Agency of Chartered Colleges and Universities in the Philippines (AACCUP). It was also rated Level II based on CHED-DBM-PASUC Leveling Evaluation. With approximately 15,000 students, it has eight colleges, graduate school, and a satellite campus in Cavite.

The institute is envisioned to develop its students in the fields of trades, business, arts, science, and technology education..

History
 
The Eulogio "Amang" Rodriguez Institute of Science and Technology (EARIST) was established after the liberation of Manila in 1945. It started as a vocational school with only one room at the second floor of the Mapa High School, nine teachers, a clerk, and 147 students. Its former name was Eulogio Rodriguez Vocational High School (ERVHS).

In July 1946, EARIST acquired its present site in Nagtahan, Santa Mesa, Manila. Apolinario Apilado was appointed as the principal, succeeded by Dr. Hilario Nudas in 1949.

EARIST's development was made possible through three Republic Acts and a Presidential Decree:
 The Republic Act 4072 was jointly sponsored by then Congressman Ramon Bagatsing and Salih Ututalum in 1964, authorized the establishment of the Technical Education Department without changing the name of the school. It was headed by a vocational director.
"Section 1. A vocational technical department which shall offer courses above secondary level is hereby established in the Eulogio Rodriguez Vocational High School in the City of Manila."

 The Republic Act 5088 was sponsored by Congressman Sergio Loyola in 1967, authorized the renaming of ERVHS to Eulogio "Amang" Rodriguez Memorial School of Arts and Trades (EARMSAT) and signaled its separation from the Division of City Schools, Manila. It was headed by a superintendent.
 The Republic Act 6595 was sponsored by Congressman Joaquin R. Roces in 1972, converted EARMSAT to EARIST with a president as its head. This made EARIST into a full-fledged college and authorized the establishment of vocational-technical school branches in each congressional district of Manila.
 The Presidential Decree 1524 which was signed by President Ferdinand E. Marcos on June 11, 1978, that converted Eulogio "Amang" Rodriguez Institute of Science and Technology (EARIST) into a chartered state college with a Board of Trustees as its governing body and Dr. Hilario G. Nudas, as its first college president.
"Further amending certain sections of Republic Act numbered four thousand seventy-two entitled "an act providing for the establishment of a vocational technical department of the Eulogio Rodriguez Vocational High School in the City of Manila" as amended by Republic Act numbered five thousand eighty-eight entitled "an act converting Eulogio Rodriguez Vocational High School into Eulogio "Amang" Rodriguez Memorial School of Arts and Trades" by providing for a board of trustees, defining the board's powers and duties, and for other purposes."

Campuses

Manila Campus
The Manila Campus of EARIST is in Nagtahan, Sampaloc. It serves as the main campus.

Cavite Campus

EARIST Cavite Campus, formerly called EARIST-GASAT (General Alvarez School of Arts and Trades), is a satellite campus. It operates with the funding support from the budgetary allotment of its mother institution, EARIST Manila. It is the only state college in Gen. Mariano Alvarez, Cavite and is accredited by the Commission on Higher Education (CHED) and by the Accrediting Agency of Chartered Colleges and Universities in the Philippines (AACCUP).

Being a government-funded college, it has been providing quality science and technology education with the lowest tuition fee for the less privileged but deserving residents in G.M.A. and other municipalities in Cavite and CALABARZON area. Established on March 24, 1982, EARIST Cavite Campus started by offering vocational and technical courses with Dr. Rodrigo Hipol as the superintendent using the old NASIDA Building. Later, it was transferred to its present campus site, a 31,282-square-meter lot donated by the National Housing Authority (NHA) to the college in 1986.

In 1983, it opened the four-year Secondary Trade Education program and offered the following collegiate courses: Bachelor of Science in Industrial Technology (BSIT) in 1985–1986; Bachelor of Science in Industrial Education (BSIE); and Bachelor of Science in Business Education (BSBE) in 1989–90; Bachelor of Science in Office Administration (BSOA) course in 1999–2000; Bachelor of Science in Computer Science (BSCS) in 1995–96; Bachelor of Science in Hotel and Restaurant Management (BSHRM); and the Bachelor of Science in education (BSE) in school year 2003–2004. Through the collaborative effort of EARIST administration and the municipal and provincial government, led by former Congressman Renato Dragon, its present three-story main building was initially constructed in March 1990 and ten-phase building projects were completed in 1999.

Student life

Athletics
EARIST Red Fox is the official name of the varsity teams of the institute. It regularly participates in athletic games organized by State Colleges and Universities Athletic Association - National Capital Region (SCUAA-NCR), Philippine Inter Schools, Colleges and Universities Athletic Association (PISCUAA), and Philippine University Games.

Some of the sports the institute has been practicing include arnis, basketball, cheerleading, chess, dancesport, sepak takraw, swimming, table tennis, and volleyball

Music
 EARIST CHORALE  Amang Aawit the official institutes Chorale. Actively participates in various competitions.
 EARIST RONDALLA  the official extracurricular activity. part of eulogio ''amang'' rodriguez institute of science and technology cultural activity program. conducted by Christian Aplaon.  rondalla is a traditional Filipino music ensemble. rondalla, originated in Spain. consist of instruments such as Banduria, octavina, Laud, Guitar and Bajo

Publication
 
The official student publication of EARIST Manila Campus is the EARIST Technozette that published its first issue in 1980. It is a member of the College Editors Guild of the Philippines (CEGP), the oldest organization of student publications in the Philippines committed to protect students' rights.

The Champion is the official student newspaper of EARIST Cavite Campus.

Student Organization
 
KAMAO Katipunan ng Mag-aaral at Organisasyon, This Organization is a progressive and democratic alliance of individuals, department based organization, interest clubs and institutional chapter organizations based inside the Eulogio “Amang” Rodriguez Institute of Science and Technology-Manila

Academics
EARIST is divided into eight colleges, graduate school, general education department, and Cavite campus.
 College of Arts and Sciences
 College of Architecture and Fine Arts
 College of Business Administration
 College of Education
 College of Engineering
 College of Hospitality Management
 College of Industrial Technology
 College of Public Administration and Criminology
 Graduate School
 General Education Department
 Distance Learning Program
 Cavite Campus

References

External links

Eulogio "Amang" Rodriguez Institute of Science and Technology website
EARIST General Mariano Alvarez Campus in Cavite

State universities and colleges in the Philippines
State universities and colleges in Manila
Universities and colleges in Cavite
Education in Sampaloc, Manila
Universities and colleges in Manila
Distance education institutions based in the Philippines
Educational institutions established in 1945
1945 establishments in the Philippines